Wild Wild Winter is a 1966 Universal Pictures beach party comedy film directed by standup comedian Lennie Weinrib and starring Gary Clarke and Chris Noel. It was produced by Bart Patton and is notable for featuring Jay and the Americans and the duo of Dick and Dee Dee in their only film appearances. The Beau Brummels, Jackie and Gayle and The Astronauts also perform onscreen.

Plot
Fraternity brothers at Alpine College in the snow-covered mountains of Lake Tahoe recruit Ronnie Duke (Clarke), a surfer friend from California to seduce Susan Benchley (Noel), head of the school sorority and secretary to Dean Carlton (James Wellman), because Susan has brainwashed the other female students on campus to avoid dating the boys.

Ronnie sets out a plan to become captain of the ski team and win over Susan, who is engaged to John Harris (Steve Franken), while he also attempts to save the school from its financial troubles.

Cast
 Gary Clarke as Ronnie
 Chris Noel as Susan
 Steve Franken as John
 Don Edmonds as Burt
 Suzie Kaye as Sandy
 Les Brown, Jr. as Perry
 James Wellman as Dean
 Val Avery as Fox
 James Frawley as Stone
 Anna Lavelle as Bus Bit Girl
 Linda Rogers as Trisha
 Buck Holland as McGee
 The Beau Brummels
 The Astronauts
 Loren Janes as The Bear
 Jay & the Americans
 Dick Miller as Rilk
 Steven Rogers as Benton

Production notes
This film was shot on location at the Alpine Meadows Ski Resort in Alpine Meadows, near Lake Tahoe, California.

Wild Wild Winter is the last of four films in the beach party genre that made use of a winter setting. The other three are MGM’s Get Yourself a College Girl (1964), AIP’s Ski Party (1965), and Columbia Pictures’ Winter A-Go-Go (1965).

A follow-up to Lennie Weinrib’s previous beach party film, Beach Ball, this film was originally titled Snow Ball, then Snowbound (the only lyrics to Wild Wild Winter’s opening theme song are “Snowbound, snowbound!”) While technically not a sequel to Beach Ball, this film utilizes the same writer (Sam Locke), producer and director as well four actors from that film’s cast: Chris Noel (named Susan in both films), Don Edmonds, James Wellman and Dick Miller. Universal signed Weinrib and Patton to a seven year contract on the basis of Beach Ball. The film's working title was Snow Ball.

The contract with Universal was to make two films a year for seven years.

Weinrib’s directing career consisted of only three films – all in the beach party genre: the aforementioned Beach Ball from 1965, and both Wild Wild Winter and Out of Sight from 1966.

The Astronauts was a Boulder, Colorado-based surf band who had a Billboard Top 100 hit in 1963 with their song “Baja.” They appeared in three other beach party films (Surf Party,  Wild on the Beach  and Out of Sight) – more than any other surf band.

Music
The composer for the film, Jerry Long also wrote the score for another beach party film, Catalina Caper. Both films are his only onscreen credits.

"Wild Wild Winter", the theme song to the film, was composed by Chester Pipkin.

The Beau Brummels are shown performing their own "Just Wait and See".

The Astronauts perform "A Change of Heart", written by Mark Gordon and the film’s composer Chester Pipkin.

Al Capps and Mary Dean wrote two songs heard in the film, "Our Love's Gonna Snowball", sung by Jackie and Gayle; and "Heartbeats", sung by Dick and Dee Dee with the Astronauts shown as performing back-up.

The Astronauts are also shown as providing back-up for Jay and the Americans' performance of “Two of a Kind," written by Victor Millrose and Tony Bruno.

A soundtrack to the film was released on Decca Records in December 1965.

Reception
The film reportedly made a profit. However, Weinrib and Patton only made one more film for Universal, Out of Sight (1966).

The New York Times called it "colorful, yes, but wearying."

See also
List of American films of 1966
 Get Yourself a College Girl
 Ski Party
 Winter A-Go-Go

References

External links 
 
Wild Wild Winter at Letterbox DVD
Wild Wild Winter at BFI
Wild Wild Winter at TCMDB

1966 films
1966 musical comedy films
American teen comedy films
Beach party films
1960s English-language films
American skiing films
Universal Pictures films
1960s American films